An infrared point sensor is a point gas detector based on the nondispersive infrared sensor technology.

Principle
Dual source and dual receivers are used for self compensation of changes in alignment, light source intensity and component efficiency. The transmitted beams from two infrared sources are superimposed onto an internal beam splitter. 50% of the overlapping sample and reference signal is passed through the gas measuring path and reflected back onto the measuring detector. The presence of combustible gas will reduce the intensity of the sample beam and not the reference beam, with the difference between these two signals being proportional to the concentration of gas present in the measuring path. The other 50% of the overlapped signal passes through the beam splitter and onto the compensation detector. The compensation detector monitors the intensity of the two infrared sources and automatically compensates for any long term drift.

Mean time between failures may go up to 15 years.

Micro heaters
Micro heaters can be used to raise the temperature from optical surfaces above ambient to enhance performance and to prevent condensation on the optical surfaces.

Range
Toxic gases are measured in the low parts per million (ppm) range. Flammable gases are measured in the 0 - 100% lower flammable limit (LFL) or lower explosive limit (LEL) range.

See also
 List of sensors
 Maintenance-free operating period
 Service life
 ATEX directive II 1G EEx ia IIC T6
 Infrared gas analyzer - for gas monitoring and analysis, rather than leak detection.

Gas sensors